Clavatula matthiasi is a species of sea snail, a marine gastropod mollusk in the family Clavatulidae.

Description

Distribution
This species occurs in the Atlantic Ocean off Angola.

References

External links
 A study on the true identity of Clavatula martensi von Maltzan, 1883 (Mollusca: Gastropoda: Clavatulidae) resulting in the description of a new species, Clavatula matthiasi; Neptunea 7 (1), January 2008

Endemic fauna of Angola
matthiasi
Gastropods described in 2008